Bills Island is an island in Antarctica. It lies northeast of Goudier Island in the harbor of Port Lockroy, in the Palmer Archipelago. It was discovered and charted by the French Antarctic Expedition, 1903–05, under Jean-Baptiste Charcot. The name appears on a chart based on a 1927 Discovery Investigations survey, but may reflect an earlier naming.

See also 
 List of Antarctic and sub-Antarctic islands

References

 

Islands of the Palmer Archipelago